The Italian Labour Union or UIL is a national trade union centre in Italy. It was founded in 1950 as a socialist, social democratic, (republican) and laic split from the Italian General Confederation of Labour (CGIL, Confederazione Generale Italiana del Lavoro). It represents almost 2.2 million workers.

The UIL is affiliated with the International Trade Union Confederation (ITUC), and the European Trade Union Confederation (ETUC).

Background

On June 3rd, 1944, while Italy was involved in World War II, party leaders Giuseppe Di Vittorio, Achille Grandi, and Emilio Canevari signed the "Pact of Rome"  on behalf of Italian Communist Party (PCI), Christian Democracy, and PSI respectively. The resulting association, known as the "United CGIL", was established to unify all the Italian workers under one banner, without regard to their political and religious views. It was the culmination of cooperative efforts by all the anti-fascist parties included in the National Liberation Committee. The pact united the three leading political movements (communist, socialist, and Catholic) in the name of workers' rights and the ongoing fight against fascism.

History
The formation of the UIL was the result of a split in the "United CGIL" pact, which was in turn induced by turbulence within the associated Italian political parties in the early post-war years, especially the tumultuous Italian Socialist Party (PSI).

Split from CGIL
The first general election of the Italian Republic was held on 18 April 1948. As a result, Socialist Unity—the political alliance formed by the Italian Democratic Socialist Party (PDSI) and reform socialists in union with Italian Republican Party (PRI)—received 7.07% of the vote for the Italian Chamber of Deputies and 3.62% for the Italian Senate. They thus participated in the 5th cabinet of Alcide De Gasperi, providing two ministers.

For the first time, the Social Democrats and Moderate Socialists entered government, while the PCI and the PSI joined the opposition. The CGIL initially attempted to strengthen links with the PCI, but later called for a general strike against the De Gasperi cabinet following the shooting of PCI general secretary Palmiro Togliatti, in an attack on 14 July 1948.

Unwilling to continue cooperation with increasingly militant socialists, on September 15, 1948 a group of Catholic trade unionists, consisting of Republicans and Social Democrats, split from CGIL. They founded a new union initially called the "Free CGIL" (Libera CGIL, LCIGL) and later named the Italian Confederation of Workers' Trade Unions (CISL). CGIL remained the union of the communists and socialists, as well as the laic and reform factions.

Said laic and reform factions were mainly associated with the Italian Liberal Party (PLI), other Republicans, Social Democrats and some autonomous socialists affiliated with the PSI faction lead by Giuseppe Romita. These factions remained in the CIGL after the Catholic split, but the increasing political militancy of CGIL strikes, including actions against Italian membership in NATO, and the violence of 17 May 1949 in Molinella pushed the non-communist groups to also split with the CGIL and form the Italian Labor Federation (FIL).

The Italian Labor Federation (FIL)

On 4 June 1949, at the Liceo Visconti in Rome, Republicans and Social Democrats founded the FIL. 

In the same summer of 1949, some trade unionists of the autonomous socialist faction led by Italo Viglianesi, split from CGIL, following the example of autonomous socialists led by Romita, who split from PSI and founded the United Socialist Party (PSU) in December 1949. Attempts by Viglianersi’s group to join the FIL were blocked by FIL leadership, as they were considering, under American pressure, merging with the Catholic LCGIL. The American embassy and the American Federation of Labor saw establishing a single, unified, non-communist trade union, to oppose the communist CGIL, as being in their interest.

The first and only FIL congress was held from 29 January to 5 February 1950 in Naples. The primary object of this meeting was to arrange the merger with LCIGL, but the decision was immediately controversial. Objections were made on both procedural grounds, (the decision had been made by FIL executives without any public voting), and on political grounds (many wanted the FIL to be independent from both Catholic and American influence). The Italian Republican Party and United Socialist Party had already urged their supporters in the FIL to oppose this merger.  

In the end, only the FIL leadership joined the LCIGL (which changed its name to the Italian Confederation of Workers' Trade Unions on April 30 1950). The bulk of the rank and file membership resolved decided to form a new union, independent from the politics and foreign influence which had sundered the CGIL and FIL.

On 5 February 1950, at the end of the congress, the FIL ceased to exist.

Formation of the Italian Labor Union (UIL)
On 5 March 1950, in the Casa dell’Aviatore (Aviator House) in Rome, 253 delegates from the now defunct FIL congress participated in the foundation of the Italian Labour Union (UIL). Despite claims to political independence, the new organization was strongly social democratic and reformist in character. The assembly president was senator Luigi Carmagnola. Other notable attendees included Italo Viglianesi, Enzo Dalla Chiesa and Renato Bulleri of the PSU; Raffaele Vanni, Amedeo Sommovigo and the former Prime Minister Ferruccio Parri, all of the PRI; several trade unionists from the PSLI; and other independent trade unionists.

The founding declaration and program approved by delegates included the UIL five founding pilasters:
 Independence from parties, from government, and from religions.
 Development of the autonomy of sectoral trade unions.
 Adoption of democratic methods via the active participation of workers in the UIL decisions.
 Tight coordination with the other two trade union confederation: CGIL and CISL.
 Intervention in any social, economic and political questions concerning workers interests.
A later addition to the declaration was a commitment towards the Mezzogiorno.

Due in part to resisting American interests by refusing to merge with the LCIGL, the union was denied political partnership and funding for several years. Despite these difficulties, in the first years the UIL consistently increased its influence among Italian workers, reaching 400,000 members by the end of 1950.

On January 1, 1952, the UIL became a member of the International Confederation of Free Trade Unions, which later, in 2006, merged into the International Trade Union Confederation (ITUC). In 1973 the UIL became a member of the European Trade Union Confederation (ETUC).

On 6 December 1953 the second UIL congress was held in Rome.

The CGIL-CISL-UIL Federation
Between 1968 and the early 1980's, left-wing CGIL, Catholic CISL and moderate-left UIL united, setting up the "CGIL-CISL-UIL Federation", a federation to coordinate (but not merge) these three major unions. The federation was similar in nature to the unified "Old" CGIL, but it did not attach members to potentially unwelcome political commitments. This federation only managed to effectively function from its foundation until the early 1970's, most obviously during Italy's Hot Autumn of labor unrest.

The federation came to an end in 1985 when a law issued by the Bettino Craxi cabinet divided the member unions. The law cut the "sliding wage scale". While differences over the law were initially papered over, these conflicts entered the public sphere when the parties of Craxi's cabinet, (DC, PSI, PSDI, PRI, PLI), launched a concerted political effort to defend the law against a proposed referendum to overturn it. The PCI, led by Enrico Berlinguer, and the CGIL, led by Luciano Lama, supported the call for a referendum on the law. The CISL and UIL, led by Pierre Carniti and Giorgio Benvenuto, and factions within the CGIL (especially those influenced by Ottaviano Del Turco) aligned themselves with the government's position against a referendum. The referendum did not materialize, and the passage of the new law led to the break-up of the CGIL-CISL-UIL Federation.

Seconda Repubblica

Beginning in 1989 and continuing into the 1990's, Italy's traditional political parties were largely dissolved in a period of heightened national turbulence. In the wake of this political revolution, the UIL became politically untethered, losing its connections with the PSDI, PLI, PRI and moderate PSI. UIL members no longer have a strong, shared political identity, although many are affiliated with the modern Socialist Party and the Democratic Party.

In 2011, according to the most recent official data, there were 2,196,442 total UIL members, with 1,328,583 active workers, 575,266 retired workers and 292,593 second membership workers.

General secretaries

Affiliated union federations

Current affiliates
The list of affiliated federation includes at present the following:

Former affiliates

See also

Italian General Confederation of Labour
Italian Confederation of Workers' Trade Unions

Notes

References

External links
 Official website

National trade union centers of Italy
International Trade Union Confederation
European Trade Union Confederation
Trade Union Advisory Committee to the OECD
Trade unions established in 1950
1950 establishments in Italy